Gurgustius was a legendary king of the Britons as accounted by Geoffrey of Monmouth.  He was the son of King Rivallo and was succeeded by Sisillius I, and then Jago, who was Gurgustius' nephew. Geoffrey has nothing to say of him beyond this.

References

Legendary British kings